An indefinite pronoun is a pronoun which does not have a specific, familiar referent. Indefinite pronouns are in contrast to definite pronouns.

Indefinite pronouns can represent either count nouns or noncount nouns. They often have related forms across these categories: universal (such as everyone, everything), assertive existential (such as somebody, something), elective existential (such as anyone, anything), and negative (such as nobody, nothing).

Many languages distinguish forms of indefinites used in affirmative contexts from those used in non-affirmative contexts. For instance, English "something" can be used only in affirmative contexts while "anything" is used otherwise.

Indefinite pronouns are associated with indefinite determiners of a similar or identical form (such as every, any, all, some). A pronoun can be thought of as replacing a noun phrase, while a determiner introduces a noun phrase and precedes any adjectives that modify the noun. Thus, all is an indefinite determiner in "all good boys deserve favour" but a pronoun in "all are happy".

Table of English indefinite pronoun usage

Most indefinite pronouns correspond to discretely singular or plural usage. However, some of them can entail singularity in one context and plurality in another. Pronouns that commonly connote indefiniteness are indicated below, with examples as singular, plural, or singular/plural usage.

Table of indefinite pronouns

List of quantifier pronouns
English has the following quantifier pronouns:

Uncountable (thus, with a singular verb form)
enough – Enough is enough.
little – Little is known about this period of history.
less – Less is known about this period of history.
much – Much was discussed at the meeting.
more (also countable, plural) – More is better.
most (also countable, plural) – Most was rotten. (Usually specified, such as in most of the food.)
plenty – Thanks, that's plenty.
Countable, singular
one – One has got through. (Often modified or specified, such as in a single one, one of them, etc.)
Countable, plural
several – Several were chosen.
few – Few were chosen.
fewer – Fewer are going to church these days.
many – Many were chosen.
more (also uncountable) – More were ignored. (Often specified, such as in more of us.)
most (also uncountable) – Most would agree.

Possessive forms
Some of the English indefinite pronouns above have possessive forms. These are made as for nouns, by adding  's or just an apostrophe following a plural -s (see English possessive).

The most commonly encountered possessive forms of the above pronouns are:
one's, as in "One should mind one's own business."
those derived from the singular indefinite pronouns ending in -one or -body: nobody's, someone's, etc. (Those ending -thing can also form possessives, such as nothing's, but these are less common.)
whoever's, as in "We used whoever's phone that is."
those derived from other and its variants: the other's, another's, and the plural others''': "We should not take others' possessions."either's, neither'sMost of these forms are identical to a form representing the pronoun plus -'s as a contraction of is or has. Hence, someone's may also mean someone is or someone has, as well as serving as a possessive.

Compound indefinite pronouns
Two indefinite pronouns can sometimes be used in combination together.
Examples: We should respect each other. People should love one another.
And they can also be made possessive by adding an apostrophe and s.
Examples: We should respect each other's beliefs. We were checking each other's'' work.

See also

References

Bibliography

External links

 Using Indefinite Pronouns

Pronouns